The 1910 International cricket season was from April 1910 to August 1910.

Season overview

June

1910 Brussels Exhibition Tournament

July

Scotland in Ireland

August

Belgium in Netherlands

References

1910 in cricket